Broder Gabrielsen is a 1966 Norwegian drama film directed by Nils R. Müller, starring Alf Malland and Mette Lange-Nielsen. The preacher Gabrielsen (Malland) has a great talent for exciting crowds and builds up a large following. His reputation is enhanced by a healing at a meeting, and Gabrielsen begins to believe in his own healing ability. When further miracles fail to occur, he experiences a crisis. The film was highly controversial in its time because of its treatment of religious fanaticism and charismatic congregations.

References

External links
 
 Broder Gabrielsen at Filmweb.no (Norwegian)

1966 films
1966 drama films
Norwegian drama films
Films directed by Nils R. Müller